The 2014 parliamentary elections in Iraq included a vote for five seats reserved for the Assyrian community. Prior to the elections, the Assyrian Democratic Movement (ADM) held three seats and Chaldean Syriac Assyrian Popular Council (CSAPC) two. A total of 84 Assyrians competed in 9 different lists.

The elections saw ADM lose one seat, CSAPC retain its two seats, and the Iraqi Communist Party win a single seat as part of the Civil Democratic Alliance list. A total of 105,109 votes were cast.

ADM was given the Baghdad and Kirkuk seats, electing members Yonadam Kanna and Sargon Lazar. However, Sargon gave up his seat to fellow party member Imad Youkhana Yaqo, in order for him to named a minister by Iraqi Prime Minister Nuri Almaliki. DThat never happened.  The original Kirkuk seat was to be given to the Popular Council, along with Nineveh, electing  Khalis Isho and Raed Ishaq. However, Khalis was immediately disqualified after the De-Ba'athification process labeled him as a former Baath Party member. Popular Council was compensated by getting the Duhok seat, by giving it to reigning parliament member Luis Caro Bandar. ICP was given the Erbil seats, and was received by Fares Jajo. Five months after the elections, in September 2014, Jajo was named the Minister of Science and Technology, leaving his seat to Joseph Sylawa, who had only received 216 votes.

Results

By candidate

References

2014 elections in Iraq